Axel Bouteille (born 14 February 1995) is a French professional basketball player for Türk Telekom of the Basketbol Süper Ligi (BSL). He is a 2.01 m (6 ft 7 in) tall small forward.

He formed in Élan Chalon, where he played from 2013 to 2017. He had good seasons in ProA, and went on to play with the France national basketball team, despite not being drafted in 2016.

In 2017 he signed for two seasons with the French club CSP Limoges.

On 3 July 2019, his signing for Bilbao Basket was made official.

In February 2020, he joined Unicaja until the end of the 2022 season.

On 15 July 2022 he signed with Türk Telekom of the Basketbol Süper Ligi (BSL).

Personal life
He is the son of former professional basketball player Franck Bouteille.

References

External links
 Liga Endesa Profile

1995 births
Living people
Baloncesto Málaga players
Bilbao Basket players
Élan Chalon players
French expatriate basketball people in Spain
French men's basketball players
Liga ACB players
Limoges CSP players
Small forwards
Sportspeople from Roanne